Richard Down (20 April 1734 – 26 July 1814) was an English banker of Bartholomew Lane in the City of London.

Early life and family
Richard Down was born in 1734 in Tiverton, Devonshire. In 1772, he married Rose Neale at St James the Great, Friern Barnet. Rose was the daughter of Henry Neale, the former owner of Halliwick Manor who lost the manor house when he was made bankrupt.

Career
Down was a partner in the prominent city bank Down, Thornton & Free, with Henry Thornton being one of the other partners. After their deaths the bank continued to trade as Pole, Thornton, Free, Down & Scott, retaining their surnames.

Death and legacy
Down died on 26 July 1814 at the age of 80 and is memorialised in a plaque at the east end of the aisle of St James's church inside the choir vestry. His wife and six of his children are additionally memorialised in a plaque by the sculptor John Bacon the younger. His Will is held by the British National Archives at Kew.

References

External links 

1734 births
1814 deaths
English bankers
Businesspeople from Tiverton, Devon